20 Years After is a 2007 American post-apocalyptic film directed by Jim Torres and Ron Harris and starring Azura Skye, Joshua Leonard, and Nathan Baesel. Filmed principally in north Alabama and southern Tennessee, the low-budget film was initially released under the title Like Moles, Like Rats, a reference to the Thornton Wilder play The Skin of Our Teeth.

Premise
The events take place 20 years after a nuclear war which was followed by plagues. No children have been born in 15 years, and people want to gain control of the first pregnant woman - Sara. Running out of water, Sara and her mother are forced to leave their shelter in Samuel's basement and join other groups of refugees who call themselves internally displaced people. Michael is a disc jockey who operates a radio station at one of the camps. David runs a gang of looters.

Cast

References

External links 
 

2000s science fiction drama films
2007 films
2000s dystopian films
Films set in the future
Films shot in Alabama
Films shot in Tennessee
American post-apocalyptic films
American pregnancy films
American science fiction drama films
2007 drama films
American dystopian films
2000s pregnancy films
2000s English-language films
2000s American films